Mohan Anand Amshekar (born 14 February 1955) is an Indian politician from Goa. He is a former Member of the Goa Legislative Assembly, representing the Sanvordem Assembly constituency from 1989 to 1994. He was a member of the Maharashtrawadi Gomantak Party.

Early and personal life
Mohan Anand Amshekar was born at Narsobawadi. He completed his primary studies at Government Primary School, Sancordem, Goa and finished his schooling from Kamakshi High School, Shiroda. He later went on to be a graduate from Damodar College of Commerce & Economics, Margao. He is married to Sunanda Amshekar and currently resides at Khadpabandh, Ponda.

References

1955 births
Living people
People from South Goa district
Goa MLAs 1989–1994
Indian politicians